Herman Liebaers (February 1, 1919 in Tienen, Belgium – November 9, 2010 in Jette, Brussels) was a Belgian linguist. He was director general of the central Belgian Royal Library and Marshal of the Royal Household of the Royal Court of Belgium.

Education
He obtained a master's degree in literature from Ghent University in 1942 and a Ph.D. in 1955 at the same university.

Career
In 1943 he started working at the Royal Library of Belgium in Brussels (Albertina). During the war he was captured by the Nazis and imprisoned in the concentration camps of Breendonk and Huy. In 1950, he spent 6 months in the U. S. with a Fulbright scholarship and worked a few weeks at the Library of Congress. From 1951 until 1956, he was also Assistant Secretary of the Belgian American Educational Foundation. In 1954 he moved on to become the librarian of CERN.

In 1956 he returned to the Royal Library in Brussels, being appointed its director general, and helped oversee the construction of its new premises. From 1969 until 1974, he was president of the International Federation of Library Associations (IFLA), and subsequently honorary president. He was an editor and biographer of the 19th-century poet Hélène Swarth.

From 1973 until 1981, he was Marshal of the Royal Household of king Baudouin I of Belgium. He was the first Dutch speaking Fleming in this post. Other Flemings had preceded him but were French-speaking members of the old nobility.

Personal life 
He was married to Isa Hereng. They had a son, Dirk, and a daughter Inge Liebaers, who was a Professor of genetics at the Vrije Universiteit Brussel.

Bibliography
 Hélène Swarths Zuidnederlandse jaren, Ghent, 1964.
 Hélène Swarth. Brieven aan Pol de Mont, Ghent, 1964
 Liebaers on Libraries and the 37th Session of IFLA in Liverpool, Wilson Library Bulletin, 45, 10, 950–951, June 1971
 Book promotion through libraries, New Delhi: Federation of Publishers and Booksellers Associations in India, 1973
 The impact of American and European librarianship upon each other, Chicago, 1977
 Small Talk about Great Books, Delivered on the Occasion of the 7th. Annual Bromsen Lecture, Boston, Mass., May 12, 1979.
 Mostly in the line of duty: thirty years with books, The Hague, Boston, London, Martinus Nijhoff Publishers, 1980
 Rond de Brusselse Warande, Brussels, 1988
 Autour Du Parc De Bruxelles, Brussels, 1988
 Books over bombs, IFLA in Moscow, August 1991
 Koning Boudewijn in spiegelbeeld, Van Halewyck, 1998
 Beyond Belgium, Van Halewyck, 2003

Sources
 International Library Associations
 Herman Liebaers' obituary 

1919 births
2010 deaths
Dignitaries of the Belgian court
Linguists from Belgium
Belgian people of World War II
Breendonk prison camp survivors
Ghent University alumni
People associated with CERN
People from Tienen